Southern Philippines College (SPC) is a private domestic corporation, non-sectarian and co-educational institution.

History

The school was established upon the proposal of Engr. Apolinar Y. Garcia and Atty. Claudio M. Aguilar in partnership with during the meeting of the Board of Directors of then Bermuda Shopping Center now known as Benito-Raymunda Realty Corporation in August 1981. The idea was to develop the conjugal real properties of the late Don Benito R. Garcia and Dona Raymunda Yabut Garcia.

On October 2, 1981, the school was formally approved by the incorporators, namely: Engr. and Mrs. Apolinar Garcia, Brgy. Captain and Mrs. George Garcia, Mrs. Adelina Nacalaban, Mr. and Mrs. Venusto Y. Garcia, Mr. and Mrs. Alfredo Y. Garcia, Dr. and Mrs. Hernando T. Mejia, Dr. and Mrs. Bernardo Resoso, Atty. and Mrs. Claudio M. Aguilar, and Don Benito R. Garcia. On October 19, 1981, the school was registered with the Securities and Exchange Commission as Southern Philippines Academy, now Southern de Oro Philippines College, in its Articles of Incorporation under SEC. Reg. No. 101440.

Academic programs

Undergraduate programs
CHED/TESDA/DepEd Accredited Courses:

 Bachelor of Science in Criminology
 Bachelor of Science in Information Technology
 Bachelor of Science in Hotel and Restaurant Management
 Bachelor of Science in Tourism Management
 Bachelor of Science in Elementary Education
 Bachelor of Science in Secondary Education
 Bachelor of Science in Business Administration Major in:
 Marketing Management
 Financial Management
 Business Economics
 Human Resource Development
 Bachelor of Science in Entrepreneurship
 Bachelor of Arts in English
 Bachelor of Arts in Economics

Graduate programs

 Master of Arts in Educational Management
 Master of Arts in Secondary Education

Short-term courses
 Professional Education
 Caregiving NC II 
 Housekeeping NC II
 Food and Beverage Services NC II
Other short-term programs also available

Basic education
 Pre-school
 Elementary
 Junior High School

Senior High School
Academic Track
 Accounting, Business and Management (ABM)
 Science, Technology, Engineering, and Mathematics (STEM)
 Humanities and Social Sciences (HUMSS)
 General Academics (GAs)
Tech-Voc Track
 Maritime
 Home Economics
 Information and Communications Technology
Other College degree with bridging program

SPC also offers Certificate in Professional Teaching. Graduates of the 2-year Associate program in HRM can have their subjects credited and proceed to Bachelor of Science in HRM.

External links
 http://www.sunstar.com.ph/southern-de-oro-philippines-college 
 SPC at the Philippine Association of Colleges and Universities

Universities and colleges in Cagayan de Oro